Verdi is an unincorporated community in Atascosa County, in the U.S. state of Texas. According to the Handbook of Texas, the community had a population of 110 in 2000. It is located within the San Antonio metropolitan area.

History
The present-day community of Verdi was founded in 1860 at Lucas Creek. It was named Lucas Community after one of the local families that settled there. However, there was already another place named Lucas in Texas, so French settler Joseph Peynagrosse changed its name to Verdi after the Verdi River in his native country. A post office was established at Verdi in 1891 and remained in operation until 1916. The community had a population of 30 in 1914. Verdi also had a church in operation in 1916. There was a church, a business, and several scattered homes in Verdi in the 1940s. Verdi began to disappear after 1950 but made a comeback in 1979 when a local Church of Christ served as a meeting place for residents in the community. The people built a community center, which continued to operate in 1986. There was no population estimate recorded for Verdi, but it was featured on 1987 county highway maps. Its population was recorded as 110 in 2000. Today, the community has several scattered homes, and the town center is no longer visible.

Settlers who came to the area by 1855 were primarily from Alabama, Arkansas, Georgia, Mississippi, Missouri, and Tennessee. Some were from Spanish origin. A Church of Christ was established in the community in 1858 and a Methodist church was added the next year. It then got a Roman Catholic church named St. Augustine Church in 1870, as well as Friendship Baptist Church in 1888. Verdi had a farming and ranching industry, in which the most common crops were produce, grains, meat, and dairy. Cotton was the most successful crop. The post office was applied by Sydney S. Smith in 1890. Businesses in Verdi included a store, a blacksmith shop, and cotton gins in the early 20th century.

Geography

Education
Verdi was home to Lucas School, the first school that opened in Atascosa County at Lucas Creek in 1860. It kept the name in 1904 and had 101 White students in attendance and two teachers. Its name was changed to Verdi School in 1913 and had 115 students enrolled. It continued to operate in 1916, and in 1934, the school had 94 students attending and five teachers. It continued to operate in 1940. It was then consolidated with the Pleasanton Independent School District in 1950. It continues to be served by the Pleasanton ISD to this day. The school was also a polling place for Atascosa County in 1860. Two schools named St. Augustine and Liberty were established sometime before 1888. Verdi school's first senior class graduated in 1933.

References

Unincorporated communities in Atascosa County, Texas
Unincorporated communities in Texas